Arka Keshari Deo is an Indian politician. He is elected to the 16th Lok Sabha in 2014 from Kalahandi constituency in Odisha.
He is a member of the Biju Janata Dal (BJD) political party. Arka joined BJD in 2013 after death of his father Bikram Keshari Deo.

See also
 Indian general election, 2014 (Odisha)

References

External links
 Info at MyNeta.com

Living people
Lok Sabha members from Odisha
India MPs 2014–2019
People from Kalahandi district
Biju Janata Dal politicians
Year of birth missing (living people)